Lorabela  pelseneeri is a species of sea snail, a marine gastropod mollusk in the family Mangeliidae.

Description
The length of the shell attains 8 mm.

Distribution
This species occurs in the Weddell Sea, Antarctica, and off the South Georgia Islands.

References

 Strebel, Herman (1908), Die Gastropoden (mit Ausnahme de nackten Opisthobranchier). Wissenschaftliche Ergebnisse der Schwedischen Südpolar-Expedition 1901-1903 6(1): 111 pp., 6 pls

External links
  Kantor Y.I., Harasewych M.G. & Puillandre N. (2016). A critical review of Antarctic Conoidea (Neogastropoda). Molluscan Research. 36(3): 153-206
  Tucker, J.K. 2004 Catalog of recent and fossil turrids (Mollusca: Gastropoda). Zootaxa 682:1-1295.
 

pelseneeri
Gastropods described in 1908